El Alto is the second-largest city in Bolivia, and the highest major metropolis in the world.

El Alto may also refer to:
 El Alto Municipality, a municipality in Bolivia which includes the city of El Alto

Argentina
 El Alto Department, a department in Catamarca Province, Argentina
 El Alto, Argentina, a village municipality in El Alto Department, Catamarca Province, Argentina

Panama
 El Alto, Panama, a subdivision of Santa Fé District in Veraguas Province, Panama

Peru
 El Alto District, a district in Talara Province, Peru
 El Alto, Peru, a village municipality in El Alto District, Talara Province, Peru

See also
 El Alto Municipality (disambiguation)